WNMP may refer to:

 WCGO, an American radio station broadcasting with the call sign WNMP until 1970
 WNMP (FM), a radio station (88.5 FM) licensed to serve Marlinton, West Virginia, United States